The Japanese destroyer {{nihongo|Hakaze|羽風| Winged Wind}} was one of 15 s built for the Imperial Japanese Navy (IJN) in the late 1910s. During the Pacific War, she supported Japanese operations during the Malayan, Dutch East Indies, and Guadalcanal Campaigns. The ship was sunk by an American submarine in early 1943.

Design and description
The Minekaze class was designed with higher speed and better seakeeping than the preceding s. They were powered by two Parsons geared steam turbines, each driving one propeller shaft, using steam provided by four Kampon water-tube boilers. Their crew consisted of 148 officers and crewmen.

The main armament of the Minekaze-class ships consisted of four  Type 3 guns in single mounts; one gun forward of the superstructure, one between the two funnels, one aft of the rear funnel, and the last gun atop the aft superstructure. The guns were numbered '1' to '4' from front to rear. The ships carried three above-water twin sets of  torpedo tubes; one mount was in the well deck between the forward superstructure and the forward gun and the other two were between the aft funnel and aft superstructure. They could also carry 20 mines as well as minesweeping gear.

Early in the war, Nos. 2 and 3 guns and both sets of aft torpedo tubes were removed in exchange for four depth charge throwers, 36 depth charges, and 10 license-built  Type 96 light AA guns.

Construction and career
Hakaze, built at the Mitsubishi shipyard in Nagasaki was laid down on 11 November 1918, launched on 21 June 1920 and completed on 16 September 1920. From 1937 to 1938, Hakaze was assigned to patrols of the northern and central China coastlines in support of Japanese combat operations in the Second Sino-Japanese War.

Pacific War
At the start of the Pacific War on 7 December 1941, Hakaze was assigned to Destroyer Division 34 under the command of the IJN 11th Air Fleet, and was based at Cape St. Jacques south of Saigon in French Indochina supporting the 22nd Air Flotilla. The destroyer's primary mission in the early stages of the Pacific War was to transport materials to Miri and Kuching in Sarawak and to Kota Bharu in Malaya for the construction of forward air bases.

In February 1942, after providing support for Operation L (the invasion of Palembang on Sumatra in the Netherlands East Indies), Hakaze was based out of Bangka, from which she made anti-submarine patrols. She was transferred to Bangkok in March, and Singapore in April. In May, Hakaze was based at Rabaul in the Solomon Islands, from which the destroyer supported the attempted Operation Mo (the invasion of Port Moresby).  After returning to Maizuru briefly for repairs at the end of May, Hakaze escorted a convoy to Saipan, and from Saipan to Hahajima in the Ogasawara Islands and back. In August, she escorted a convoy from Saipan to Rabaul and began patrols from that base through October. In October, she escorted several convoys in preparation of the Guadalcanal offensive. In November, after being used as a "Tokyo Express" high-speed transport to convey troops from Buin to Munda, she made an additional four transport runs in the same month.

From the end of November through 20 January 1943, Hakaze was assigned to patrol/escort duties in the Shortlands–Buka–Rabaul–Kavieng sector. On 1 March 1943, Hakaze was stricken from the Navy List.

Notes

References

 

 

Minekaze-class destroyers
Hakaze
1920 ships
Second Sino-Japanese War naval ships of Japan
World War II destroyers of Japan
Ships sunk by American submarines
World War II shipwrecks in the Pacific Ocean
Shipwrecks in the Bismarck Sea
Maritime incidents in January 1943